Grand Pass Township is an inactive township in Saline County, in the U.S. state of Missouri.

Grand Pass Township was erected in 1841, taking its name from a mountain pass within its borders.

References

Townships in Missouri
Townships in Saline County, Missouri